The Tanner Farmhouse is a historic residence near Wilmer, Alabama, United States.  Completed in 1886, the one-story house was designed by Joseph A. Fills.  Due to its architectural significance, it was added to the National Register of Historic Places on May 20, 2008.

References

Houses on the National Register of Historic Places in Alabama
National Register of Historic Places in Mobile County, Alabama
Houses in Mobile County, Alabama
Houses completed in 1886